Mount Fitzpatrick is located in the Salt River Range in the U.S. state of Wyoming.  The peak is the highest in the Salt River Range.

References

Mountains of Lincoln County, Wyoming
Fitzpatrick